Brigadier General Victor Navarro Corpus (born October 4, 1944) is a retired Filipino military officer and public official best known for his 1970 defection from the Armed Forces of the Philippines (AFP) to the New People's Army of the Communist Party of the Philippines during the authoritarian regime of Ferdinand Marcos, for his defection from the NPA in 1976, his return to the AFP after the 1986 People Power Revolution, and his later role as chief of the Intelligence Service of the Armed Forces of the Philippines (ISAFP).

A member of the Philippine Military Academy Class of 1967, he was promoted to the rank of Brigadier General of the AFP in May 2003, and retired with that rank when  he reached retirement age in October 2004.

Early life and education 
Corpus was born on 4 October 1944 in San Pablo City, Laguna. His father was Col. Vicente Corpus of the AFP Medical Corps. He took his elementary and high school studies at De La Salle University, and then on his father's insistence, entered the Philippine Military Academy in 1963. Corpus eventually graduated from PMA as part of the "Dimasupil" class of 1967.

Career 
He entered the Philippine Army, where he received Airborne and Special Forces training. He later transferred to the Philippine Constabulary.  Disgruntled by corruption in the armed forces, he opted for an assignment as instructor at the PMA.

1970 PMA Armory raid 
On 29 December 1970, Corpus formally defected to the New People's Army and led a raid on the PMA armory.  Timing the raid when most cadets were out on Christmas vacation and the PMA's senior officers including its Superintendent, General Ugalde had left the camp to meet President Ferdinand Marcos upon his scheduled arrival in nearby Baguio City.

Corpus, who was PMA's designated officer of the day (OOD), guided the NPA raiding team which managed to escape with Browning Automatic Rifles, carbines, machine guns, and various other weapons and ammunition.

1976 surrender 
Disgruntled with the Communist Party of the Philippines, Corpus decided to surrender to government in 1976, and spent the rest of the Marcos dictatorship in prison. After Marcos was deposed in the peaceful 1986 EDSA Revolution, Corpus was granted clemency by President Corazon Aquino.

Return to the AFP and retirement 
In 1987, Corpus was reinstated into the Armed Forces of the Philippines, with a rank of Lieutenant Colonel.
He was promoted to the rank of Brigadier General of the AFP in May 2003, and retired with that rank when he reached retirement age in October 2004.

References 

Living people
1944 births
Philippine Military Academy alumni
Philippine Military Academy Class of 1967
Defectors
Filipino political commentators